Mamadi Sangare (born 4 December 1982) is a retired Guinean-Ukrainian footballer who played as a defender. Sangaré last played for FC Avanhard Kramatorsk. He is better known for playing in CSKA Kyiv and being the first one outside the post Soviet territory to accept the Ukrainian citizenship.

Career
Born in Conakry, Sangaré began in his homeland Guinea with AS Kaloum Star and signed 2001 with the Premier-Liha club FC Arsenal Kyiv at that time known as CSKA Kyiv (until December 2001). Sangare, however, at first was placed to play for the Army's second team playing in the Persha Liha. Upon the reorganization of CSKA in December 2001 he stayed with the Army club playing in the second division rather than the newly created city's club of Arsenal.

The first game in Ukraine he played on 9 April 2001 in Mykolaiv against the local team playing in the First League. The Armymen lost it 0:2. However, in his next participation a week later CSKA-2 (as it was known then) won, while playing away against the Dnipro's second team 1:0. In his first season Sangare played total of 11 games in the first league as well as one game for another club from Borodyanka Systema-Borex playing in the Druha Liha.

He played for five years (until the end of 2005) in FC CSKA Kyiv a total of 113 league games scoring 7 goals. In 2001–02 season Sangaré also played couple more games on loan with the Druha Liha club Systema-Borex scoring a winning goal against FC Dniester Ovidiopol. In those first five years he also participated in the Ukrainian Cup competitions earning five caps for CSKA Kyiv in August 2003 and 2004. Beside playing on the professional level Sangaré also participated in the Kyiv Oblast championship playing for FC Hran Buzova, for which he participated in the national amateur competitions as well.

Seeing that CSKA will not make to the Vyscha Liha, in the fall of 2006 he signed with Moldovan FC Nistru Otaci that played in the Divizia Naţională.

Desna Chernihiv
After playing 46 games and scoring another 5 goals Sangaré, nevertheless, returned to Ukraine signing in January 2008 with another club of Persha liha FC Desna Chernihiv. There he played 31 games (1 goal) and two games in the Ukrainian Cup.

Atyrau
At the start of 2009 Sangaré moved to play for FC Atyrau in Kazakhstan. At the start of 2010 he finally managed to sign with the 2010 Ukrainian Cup winners Tavriya Simferopol for which he, however, played only in the championship for reserves. In summer of 2010 the Ukrainian defender signed again with the Persha Liha club FC Lviv.

Honours
 FC Atyrau
 Kazakhstan Cup: 2009

 SC Tavriya Simferopol
 Ukrainian Cup: 2009–10

Personal
Sangare who was born in Conakry, Guinea holds the Ukrainian passport, he was naturalized in 2005.

External links

1982 births
Living people
Guinean footballers
Expatriate footballers in Ukraine
Guinean expatriate sportspeople in Ukraine
Guinea youth international footballers
Ukrainian footballers
Ukrainian expatriate footballers
Expatriate footballers in Moldova
Expatriate footballers in Kazakhstan
FC CSKA Kyiv players
FC Systema-Boreks Borodianka players
SC Tavriya Simferopol players
FC Lviv players
FC Dynamo Khmelnytskyi players
FC Desna Chernihiv players
FC Kramatorsk players
Sportspeople from Conakry
AS Kaloum Star players
Naturalized citizens of Ukraine
FC Zhenis Astana players
Association football central defenders